Fesca-San Girolamo is a railway station in the Italian city of Bari, in the Province of Bari, Apulia. The station lies on the Bari–Barletta railway. The train services are operated by Ferrotramviaria.

Train services
The station is served by the following service(s):

Bari Metropolitan services (FM1) Ospedale - Bari

See also
Railway stations in Italy
List of railway stations in Apulia
Rail transport in Italy
History of rail transport in Italy

References

 This article is based upon a translation of the Italian language version as at October 2014.

External links

Railway stations in Apulia
Buildings and structures in the Province of Bari
Railway stations opened in 1963